Situated between three major United States cities and on the border with Canada, there are many sources of media in Erie, Pennsylvania. Erie is home to five major television broadcast networks, one daily newspaper, a city-regional magazine, several radio stations and one major social media news website.

Television stations
Erie's unique position along the shores of Lake Erie can offer a wide variety of over-the-air television stations. Canada's CityTV (from its Woodstock, Ontario transmitter CITY-DT-2), CTV 2 (via CFPL-DT) and CBC Television (via CBLT-DT's repeater, CBLN) from London, Ontario can be viewed in portions of downtown Erie and areas north of Interstate 90. Additionally, select areas of the Erie region can receive broadcast channels from Buffalo, New York, Cleveland, Ohio, and Pittsburgh, Pennsylvania. The region itself, however, is served by five major television stations based in Erie. Erie is ranked as Designated Market Area #144 by the Nielsen Company.

Major Erie television affiliates include:

WICU, NBC, channel 12
WJET, ABC, channel 24
WSEE, CBS, channel 35
WQLN, PBS, channel 54
WFXP, Fox, channel 66

Erie has an affiliate station of The CW via The CW Plus called WSEE-DT2, which is broadcast digitally over the air on WSEE's digital subchannel 35-2, and on local cable systems. Erie does not have a MyNetworkTV affiliate, nor are any of the service's neighboring stations are carried on local providers in the area. Digital multicast networks are available on the subchannels of the stations above.

Radio stations
The Erie region has a large list of AM and FM stations, with all major genres covered.  Many of Erie's radio channels can be heard in Southern Ontario, Canada.  Likewise, some London area, channels and radio stations can be picked up in various parts of the Erie shoreline.

FM
Stations with transmitters located within  of Erie:

AM
Stations with transmitters located within  of Erie:

Print
As newspaper mergers occurred throughout the 20th century, Erie was left with one regional daily newspaper.  Few community newspapers exist in the region.  Erie has seen alternative magazines come and go as well.

Daily
 The Corry Journal
 Erie Times-News
 The Meadville Tribune

Weekly
 The Albion News
 The Edinboro News
 Erie Reader
 North East News-Journal
 West County News-Journal

Monthly
 Erie Gay News
 Great Lakes Life Magazine
 Lake Erie Lifestyle Magazine

References

External links 
 GoErie.com Official Erie Times-News website
 ErieTrends.com Official ErieTrends Social News website
 ErieReader.com Official Erie Reader website
 ErieTVNews.com Official WICU/WSEE-TV website
 YourErie.com Official WJET/WFXP-TV website
 CWErie.com Official CW Erie website
 WQLN.org Official WQLN website

Lists of mass media by city in the United States